The Only Way is a 2004 American film about a school shooting directed by David Zimmerman III and Levi Obery. The film is loosely based on the April 20, 1999 tragedy at Columbine High School. The film was shot on location in Metamora, Illinois, Washington, Illinois, Pekin, Illinois, and Peoria, Illinois with Metamora Township High School, the same high school from which the film's directors graduated, serving as the principal location.

Plot
Devon Browning (Billy Kearney) is a bullied outcast who has a family member dead, causing him to be depressed. As a result, He shoots up his school, killing his bullies and his date, Jamie (Victoria Corwin), before he is arrested.

Cast
Billy Kearny as Devon Browning

Victoria Corwin as Jamie

Dustin Reinmann as Josh

Jerry Stowell as Mr. Roberts

Valerie Christy as Lauren Roberts

Philip Marcille as Stan

Home media
A limited edition DVD of the film was released on June 19, 2007. The DVD contained the original version of the film (also referred to as the "school cut") and a new "re-cut" version of the film. The 2007 version is slightly different from the original version and most notably contains more violent gruesome imagery and language not suitable for the premiere of the film, which took place at Metamora Township High School. On December 29, 2008, two new DVDs were released: the School Cut Special Edition and the Re-Cut Special Edition. Both versions of the film were also made available On Demand for the first time. The School Cut is targeted at schools and other organizations for educational purposes.  A new website, The Only Way: Resources for Teachers and Parents, was launched by the filmmakers as a companion to the School Cut.

See also
Columbine High School massacre
School shooting
Duck! The Carbine High Massacre, another low budget film panned by critics

References

External links
 
 Official website
 Resources for Teachers and Parents

2004 films
2000s teen drama films
American teen drama films
Drama films based on actual events
Works about the Columbine High School massacre
Films about school violence
Films about bullying
Films shot in Illinois
2004 drama films
2000s English-language films
2000s American films